Taste of Kerala is a popular cookery show which airs on Amrita TV.
It is hosted by Raj Kalesh Later Replaced By Serah and then in late 2011 was replaced by Amrita TV Vanitharathnam Contestant Reena Basheer . The show is primarily based upon Cuisine of Kerala.

It shows the preparation of ancient traditional regional dishes which have been passed over generations. The host visits mainly villages of Kerala to find age old secret recipes. It is mostly shot at Kerala and occasionally Dubai. The show has been on air since 2005 and  has completed over 100 episodes.

The show airs every Sunday at 12.30 pm IST. In UAE, it airs at 11 am. The show was Well accepted by Malayali Audience.

References
https://web.archive.org/web/20090831072235/http://www.amritatv.com/html/tasteofkerala.php

External links
Website
Official Site
Official Youtube Site with Recipes

2005 Indian television series debuts
Indian cooking television series
Kerala cuisine